This article details the match results and statistics of the Timor-Leste national football team.

Results

2003

2004

2006

2007

2008

2010

2011

2012

2014

2015

2016

2017

2018

2019

2021

2022

Record by opponent

Notes

See also
Timor-Leste national football team records and statistics

References

External links
Timor-Leste - Fixtures & Results at FIFA.com

Results
National association football team results